Anton Albert Enus is a South African-born Australian news presenter. He is currently co-host of SBS World News on Special Broadcasting Service (SBS).

Career
Enus presented SBS World News Australia late edition, which aired on weeknights at 9.30pm until December 2007. Due to the departure of both Mary Kostakidis and Stan Grant as co-hosts of SBS World News Australia, Enus was appointed co-host of the bulletin on 17 December 2007.

Enus has been a news presenter and journalist for over 25 years. He has been with SBS World News Tonight for the past five years, after a 15-year career in radio and television with South Africa's national broadcaster, SABC. Enus' achievements include the CNN World Report award for best international report and the Bokmakierie Award for current affairs. Before leaving South Africa, Enus presented the country's major evening national news bulletin for the SABC.

Personal life
Enus was a founding member of South Africa's gay and lesbian sports movement in the early 1980s and was on the organising team that guided the country into the Gay Games for the first time in 1994. He has also served on committees aimed at reconciling Johannesburg's multi-cultural gay and lesbian communities. Enus presented a special report about international LGBT issues during SBS's coverage of the 2014 Sydney Mardi Gras

Enus is a keen long-distance runner, having completed more than 4 standard or ultra-marathons. He has completed South Africa's premier ultra-marathon, the Comrades (90 km), twice. He also enjoys squash, tennis, road running and hiking. In 1999, he migrated to Sydney with Roger Henning, his partner of 10 years, and they both became Australian citizens in July 2002.

In December 2016 he was diagnosed with early-stage bowel cancer and went public with the news in early 2017, which encouraged others to publicise the importance of using the testing kits provided by the government.

References

External links
 Anton Enus on SBS News Online
 

Australian broadcast news analysts
Gay journalists
South African LGBT broadcasters
South African LGBT journalists
Australian LGBT broadcasters
Australian LGBT journalists
Living people
Naturalised citizens of Australia
Australian reporters and correspondents
South African emigrants to Australia
Special Broadcasting Service
Television in Sydney
1961 births
21st-century LGBT people